Joseph Nutting (1660–1722) was an English engraver, working in London. He is known for his portraits, often used as book frontispieces.

Works

He was apprenticed to John Savage.

Nutting's style resembled that of Robert White. His subjects included Mary Capell, Duchess of Beaufort, after Robert Walker; Sir Edmund Berry Godfrey; John Locke, after Sylvester Brownover; Thomas Greenhill, after Thomas Murray, prefixed to his Art of Embalming, 1705; Aaron Hill the poet, 1705; Sir Bartholomew Shower; Sir John Cheke; James Bonnell; the Rev. Matthew Mead; William Elder, the engraver; and the family of Rawlinson of Cark, five ovals on one plate.

Nutting engraved around 1690 A New Prospect of the North Side of the City of London, with New Bedlam and Moore Fields, a large work on three sheets, and some other topographical plates.

Notes

1660 births
1722 deaths
English engravers